Tommy Roger Suoraniemi (born 28 February 1969) is a Swedish handball player who competed in the 1992 Summer Olympics.

He was born in Tensta.

In 1992 he was a member of the Swedish handball team which won the silver medal. He played one match and scored four goals.

At club level Souraniemi played for HK Drott. He won two national championships, 1991 and 1994.

References

1969 births
Living people
Swedish male handball players
Olympic handball players of Sweden
Handball players at the 1992 Summer Olympics
Olympic silver medalists for Sweden
Olympic medalists in handball
Medalists at the 1992 Summer Olympics
20th-century Swedish people